Earl C. "Tuffy" Abell (May 29, 1892 – May 26, 1956) was an American football player and coach.  He played college football as a tackle at Colgate University.  He later returned to Colgate as an assistant coach in 1925, and took over the head coaching job in 1928.  He spent the 1929 and 1930 football seasons as head football coach at the University of Virginia.  Abell was inducted into the College Football Hall of Fame as player in 1973.

Early  life
Abell attended Portage High School in Portage, Wisconsin.

Coaching career

VMI
Abell was the 13th head football coach at Virginia Military Institute (VMI) in Lexington, Virginia, serving for two seasons, from 1917 to 1918, and compiling a record of 7–7–1.

Colgate
Abell was the 22nd head football coach at Colgate University in the Hamilton New York, serving for the 1928 season, and compiling a record of 6–3.

Personal life
Born in Portage, Wisconsin, Abell attended Colgate University, where he became a member of the Delta Kappa Epsilon fraternity. Abell was married and had three children. He worked for the American Can Company upon retiring from coaching. He died of a heart attack on May 26, 1956.

Head coaching record

Football

Note: In the 1918 season, Abell served as a co-coach alongside Mose Goodman.

Basketball

References

External links
 
 

1892 births
1956 deaths
American football tackles
Colgate Raiders football coaches
Colgate Raiders football players
Mississippi State Bulldogs football coaches
Sewanee Tigers football coaches
Virginia Cavaliers football coaches
VMI Keydets basketball coaches
VMI Keydets football coaches
College Football Hall of Fame inductees
People from Portage, Wisconsin
Coaches of American football from Wisconsin
Players of American football from Wisconsin
Basketball coaches from Wisconsin